Jesse Borrego (born August 1, 1962) is an American actor best known for his roles as Cruz Candelaria in Blood In Blood Out, Jesse V. Velasquez in Fame, Gael Ortega in 24, and George King in Dexter.

Early life
Jesse Borrego was born in San Antonio, Texas, to Gloria Flores and Jesse Borrego Sr., an accordion player and singer of conjunto Mexican music. Jesse is the second oldest of five children: Gloria Marina, James, Georgina, and Grace. As a youth Jesse often danced with his sister Marina entering and winning several dance contests. Borrego lived with his grandparents during his high school years. He considered going into the US Air Force to become a pilot but pursued an acting career instead because it came naturally to him. After graduating from Harlandale High School, he attended University of the Incarnate Word, studying theater and dance, and The California Institute of the Arts alongside actor Don Cheadle. He earned a degree in Performance in 1984. About the same time, he attended an open audition for the TV Series Fame where he won the role of "Jesse Velasquez" for seasons 4, 5 and 6 from 1984-1987.

Career
He was a regular on the musical television series Fame for the show's final three seasons from 1984-1987. He appeared on Married... with Children as Bruno in the episode "Can't Dance, Don't Ask Me" (1989). He is well-remembered for his performance in the film Blood In Blood Out portraying the role of Cruz Candelaria.

Borrego appeared in productions at the Joseph Papp Theatre in New York City and the Mark Taper Forum in Los Angeles. In addition to performing on stage and in films such as Mi Vida Loca, Follow Me Home, New York Stories, and Con Air, he began Lupita Productions in 1990. He has produced theatrical productions and concerts as well as two 16mm short films: El Suendo de Simon (1993) by James Borrego and Flattime (1995) by Jimmy Santiago Baca. He also played role of an original gangster on DarkRoom Familia's "Veteranos" in 1999. Borrego is a member of the theatre group "Tribal Players." He is well known for his recurring roles on the third season of 24 as Gael Ortega and the third season of Dexter as George King. In 2009, Borrego starred in the movie La Mission where he reunited with former Blood In Blood Out co-star Benjamin Bratt.

Borrego has also had his hand in directing. Borrego directed the no-budget indie film titled Closer to Bottom which premiered at the inaugural Austin Indie Fest in November, 2017. The movie won an award for Best Made in Texas Feature Film.

Filmography

Film
 1989 New York Stories as Reuben Toro
 1991 Spy Games as Sam
 1991 Before the Storm (TV movie)
 1993 City of Passion (short) 
 1993  short 
 1993  as Juan "El Duran" Temido
 1993 Blood In Blood Out as Cruz Candelaria 
 1994 I Like It Like That as Alexis
 1995 Tecumseh: The Last Warrior (TV movie) as Tecumseh
 1995 Bienvenido Welcome as Dario / Jijio
 1995 Flattime (short) 
 1996 Dalva (TV movie) as Duane Stonehorse
 1996 Pain Flower as Gus
 1996 Lone Star as Danny
 1996 Follow Me Home (indie film) as Tudee
 1997 The Maker (indie film) as Felice A. Beato
 1997 Con Air as Francisco Cindino
 1997 Retroactive as Jesse
 1998 Veteranos as Santo
 1998 Black as Jesus
 1998 Bubba & Ike as The Matador
 1998 Liteweight as Sammy
 1999 The Darkest Day (TV movie) as Jonathan
 2000 A Lowrider Weekend (video) 
 2000 Hell Swarm (TV movie) as Darius
 2001 Come and Take it Day as Jesse
 2003 Scooby-Doo! and the Monster of Mexico (video) as Luis Otero
 2003 The Maldonado Miracle (TV movie) as Hector Maldonado
 2003 The Shadow Chaser (short)
 2005 The New World as Pepaschicher
 2008 The Bookie as Jesus
 2009 Dream Healing (indie film) as Marco
 2009 La Mission as Rene
 2011 Colombiana as Fabio Restrepo
 2013 Wappo vs the World (short) as Jesse
 2013 Mission Park (indie film) as Mr. Ramirez 
 2013 Go for Sisters (indie film) as Juan Calles
 2014 Closer To Bottom (indie film) as Thomas
 2014 Duque (indie film) as Martin Duque
 2014 Three Hundred Miles For Stephanie (TV movie) as Alberto Rodriguez
 2014 HOA Havoc (indie film) costarring Daniel Baldwin
 2014 The Untitled GW Project (indie film) as Agent Montoya

Television
 1984-1987 Fame (1982 TV series) - seasons 4-6 as Jesse Velasquez
 1987 Miami Vice - Jack Of All Trades - sea5 ep12 as Octavio
 1987 The Bronx Zoo (TV series) - Small Victories - sea1 ep3 as Julio Gaspare
 1988 Miami Vice - A Bullet For Crocket - sea4 ep19 as Enrique Lorca Mendez
 1989 Married... with Children - Can't Dance Don't Ask - sea3 ep13 as Bruno
 1990 Midnight Caller - Kid Salinas - sea2 ep14 as Carlos Mendez
 1991 China Beach - 100 Klicks Out - sea4 ep1 as Hector
 1991 Under Cover (TV series) - Sacrifices - sea1 ep3 as Sam Hamadi
 1995 500 Nations vol.2 - Mexico The Rise & Fall Of The Aztecs as voice
 1997 Chicago Hope - The Sun Also Rises - sea3 ep19 as Michael Waters
 1997 ER - Ambush - sea4 ep1 as HIV Patient
 1998 The Hunger (TV series) TV Series - Plain Brown Envelope - sea1 ep19 as Jess
 1999 Brimstone (TV series) - Lovers - sea1 ep9 as Paco Gomez 
 1999 Magnificent Seven (TV series) - Love & Honor - sea2 ep3 as Don Paulo 
 2001 Touched By An Angel - Mi Familia - sea7 ep11 as Tommy
 2001 Happily Ever After Fairy Tales for Every Child - The Elves & The Shoemaker - sea2 ep24 as voice
 2002 American Family - Journey of Dreams pt.1 - sea1 ep20 as Shady
 2002 What's New, Scooby-Doo? - 3-D Struction - sea1 ep2 as Luis Cepeda
 2003 24 - Day 3 - sea3 eps 1-11 as Gael Ortega
 2002 American Family (2002 TV series) - Journey of Dreams pt.2 -sea1 ep21 as Shady
 2004 24 (TV series) - Day 3 - sea3 eps 15-17 as Gael Ortega 
 2005 Medical Investigation - Mission La Roca pt.2 - sea1 ep20 as Antonio Baracas
 2005 Medical Investigation - Mission La Roca pt.1 - sea1 ep19 as Antonio Baracas
 2005 Behind The Mask Of Zorro - documentary as Joaquin Murrieta 
 2006 CSI Miami - Free Fall - sea 4 ep20 as Nicholas Suero
 2007 ER - Black Out - sea14 ep7 as Javier
 2007 ER - Gravity - sea14 ep4 as Javier
 2007 CSI Crime Scene Investigation - Lying Down With Dogs - sea8 ep10 as Felix Rodriguez
 2008 Dexter - Do You Take Dexter Morgan -  sea3 ep12 as George "The Skinner" King / Captain Jorge "El Fierro" Orozco
 2008 Dexter - I Had A Dream - sea3 ep11 - George King
 2008 Dexter - Go Your Own Way - sea3 ep10 as George King
 2008 Dexter - About Last Night - sea3 ep9 as George King
 2008 Dexter - The Damage A Man Can Do - sea3 ep8 - George King
 2008 Dexter - The Lion Sleeps Tonight - sea3 ep7 as George King
 2008 ER - Believe The Unseen - sea14 ep12 as Javier
 2008 Independent Lens - Writwriter - sea9ep 24 as voice
 2011 Chaos (TV series) - Proof of Life - sea.1 ep3 as Ernesto Salazar
 2013 Burn Notice - Things Unseen - sea.7ep 10 as Nando
 2014 From Dusk Till Dawn: The Series - Place of Dead Roads - sea.1 ep6 as T.T. Doorman
 2017 Fear the Walking Dead Season 3 as Efraín
 2020 Vida - Episode 19 as Victor

References

 Conjunto Borrego bid farewell to Salute-The Music Beat  posted 7-20-2012 blog mysanantonio.com/TheMusicBeat
 Where are they now - Back to School Fame forever.com
 Actor Jesse Borrego, Guest co-host !!/ Kens5.com San Antonio www.kens5.com  Great Day San Antonio Show

External links

1962 births
Living people
American male film actors
American male stage actors
American male television actors
American male voice actors
University of the Incarnate Word alumni
20th-century American male actors
21st-century American male actors
American male actors of Mexican descent
Hispanic and Latino American male actors
Harlandale High School alumni